Phoradendron californicum, the desert mistletoe or mesquite mistletoe, is a hemiparasitic plant native to southern California, Nevada, Arizona, Sonora, Sinaloa and Baja California. It can be found in the Mojave and Sonoran Deserts at elevations of up to 1400 m (4600 feet).

The mistletoe is a leafless plant that attaches to host plants, often leguminous woody desert trees such as Cercidium and Prosopis. Desert mistletoe takes water and minerals from its host plants but it does its own  photosynthesis, making it a hemiparasite.

During the winter it produces inconspicuous, fragrant flowers. Female desert mistletoe plants produce red to clear berries that are eaten by the phainopepla (Phainopepla nitens), a silky flycatcher, which then spreads the seeds. Phainopeplas cannot digest the seed of desert mistletoe, so the birds disperse the seeds when they defecate or wipe their bills.

Human Use
Common names include visco, tojí, tzavo, secapalo, injerto, and chili de espino in Spanish; aaxt in Seri.

The white to reddish fruits are edible, but native tribes ate only the fruits of mistletoes growing on mesquite (Prosopis), ironwood (Olneya tesota) or catclaw acacia (Acacia greggii). Found growing on palo verdes (Parkinsonia) or Condalia (desert buckthorn) the fruits are considered inedible.  The Seri people consider desert mistletoe fruit ripe and harvestable once it turns translucent. Harvest is done by spreading a blanket below the plant and hitting it with sticks to release the fruit. Seri  consumed the fruit raw.  The Tohono O'odham also consumed the fruit raw. River Pima ate the fruit boiled and mashed, which made it the consistency of a pudding. The Cahilla gathered the fruits November through April and boiled them into a paste with a sprinkle of wood ash added to the pot.

Desert mistletoe plants, but not the berries, contain phoratoxins which can easily lead to death via slowed heart rate, increased blood pressure, convulsions, or cardiac arrest. Some of these compounds can cause hallucinations, but there is no way to judge dosage. People seeking a "high" from mistletoe still turn up in morgues each year. Native peoples used plants other than desert mistletoe to seek visions.

Amateur entrepreneurs in Tucson, Phoenix and other cities in the Sonoran Desert frequently sell cuttings of desert mistletoe on street corners during the Christmas season. This is despite the fact that the species looks very different from other mistletoes traditionally used as holiday decorations elsewhere.

Gallery

References

Bowers, Janice and Brian Wignall. Shrubs and Trees of the Southwest Deserts. Arizona:  Western National Parks Association, 1993. 
Desert Mistletoe Web of Science 5 October 2009
Epple, Anne. A Field Guide to the Plants of Arizona. Arizona:  Lewann Publishing Company, 1995. 
Viscaceae (Loranthaceae). Arizona-Sonora Desert Museum.

External links
Jepson Manual Treatment
Photo gallery

californicum
Parasitic plants
Flora of the California desert regions
Flora of the Sonoran Deserts
Flora of Baja California
Flora of California
Flora of Arizona
Flora of Nevada
Flora of Utah
Flora of Sonora
Flora of Sinaloa
Plants used in Native American cuisine
Plants described in 1848
Flora without expected TNC conservation status